The Topklasse is the highest league of amateur women's football in the Netherlands, and the second tier in general.

In the 2011/12 season the Topklasse was created and thus the former second level Hoofdklasse became a third level league.

Format
The teams play each other two times over the course of the season. The last two teams get relegated into the Hoofdklasse, while the third and fourth-last teams play a relegation play-off. There is no promotion as of now.

Champions

References

External links
League at women.soccerway.com
Website about women's football, (standings, pairings,..)

Women's football leagues in the Netherlands